Finding Beauty in Negative Spaces is the fourth studio album by South African rock band Seether. The album was released in South Africa and Switzerland on 19 October 2007, and released worldwide on 23 October 2007. It is the first album by the band without lead guitarist Pat Callahan.

The cover artwork was designed by David Ho, the same artist who designed the cover for the album Vicious Delicious by Infected Mushroom. The covers apparently display the same character, "Candice the Ghost."

Three singles, "Fake It", "Rise Above This" and "Breakdown" have been released from the album with all three being top 10 singles, the former two reaching the top position on several Billboard charts, despite generally negative reviews from critics. The album was reissued in 2009 featuring a fourth single, a cover of George Michael's "Careless Whisper".

Background
Between the release of 2005's Karma and Effect and the beginning of recording sessions for Finding Beauty in Negative Spaces, lead singer and guitarist Shaun Morgan split with Evanescence lead singer Amy Lee with whom he had been in a relationship with since 2003. The breakup happened due to Morgan's problems with substance abuse, particularly alcoholism. In late July 2006, Morgan checked himself into rehab for what he described as "a dependence on a combination of substances." Combined with the leak of the Evanescence single "Call Me When You're Sober", which Lee later revealed to be about her relationship with Morgan, his stint in rehab and relationship troubles with Lee became widely publicized and a point of frustration.

The band updated both their official website and MySpace on 23 August 2007, with the new single, "Fake It", being uploaded to both. In a post on their website, they wrote:

In the lower right corner of the front cover, where the album title appears, one can faintly see a Chinese symbol overwritten by the letters of the title. The symbol shown is 美, the Chinese character for the word "beauty", or "America".

Recording and writing 
Bassist Dale Stewart credited Morgan for naming the album. Stewart explained, "[I]t’s a title that Shaun came up with one day and it immediately just stuck. I think for all of us, it was a timely and appropriate word to describe the last year that we’ve had, you know with writing an album and some other stuff that has happened around us. [...] [T]he music was always the one positive thing that came out of this string of bad things and it really just kind of kept us going." In a shift from previous albums, the band sought to emphasise melody while complimenting it with their traditional post-grunge sound. Morgan told Reuters, "We wanted to write and explore the more melodic and musical side of everything... We can be heavy and rock out, but we can also write songs that can compete with any other song out there. That was a really big motivation." Additionally, he described Finding Beauty in Negative Spaces as "an album of extremes."

The track "Like Suicide" drew disapproval from Wind-up Records, who wanted to exclude the song from the album. "The band wanted 'Like Suicide' on the album, and the label didn't," Morgan told LiveDaily. "We said, 'Fine. We'll make it indispensable to the album.' We started filming it and putting it on YouTube and putting it on MySpace. We went through the whole phase of writing it and rehearsing it to recording the drums, bass, guitar solos and vocals.[...] Then, after we finished recording it, they said, 'Oh, you're so right.'"

The album's lead single, "Fake It", deals with what Morgan perceived to be a lack of personal authenticity in modern society. In an interview with Revolt In Style, he stated that the song "was [partially] inspired by LA, some [of it] was inspired by my sister. She’s fifteen and she represents what I would consider kids of today, and what I feel kids of today are like. She cares more about Paris Hilton not wearing underwear than great artists. [...] If you don’t have people striving to be themselves, or to be creative, then ultimately people just burn. Concentrating on their physical appearance more than their personality."

For the album's third single, "Breakdown", Morgan stated that his relationship with Lee was "a very big part of the inspiration for that song." He further described the song as being "about not allowing yourself to be beaten down by what people say about you and kind of believing in yourself, and ultimately knowing that you’ll be better for it."

"Fallen" is about Morgan's experience in a relationship with a model and being unwillingly exposed to model culture as a result.

"Rise Above This" was written for Shaun's brother, Eugene Welgemoed, prior to the latter's suicide on 13 August 2007. According to Morgan, the song was written about an earlier suicide attempt by Eugene and was intended to bring him out of a depression. The song's guitar riff was influenced by the Smashing Pumpkins song "1979".

When asked about "No Jesus Christ", Morgan revealed the song is "an attack on the God complex that people have" and implied that it was inspired by Amy Lee as well.

"Walk Away from the Sun" was the first song completed for the album. Morgan stated that it was partially inspired by his stint in rehab.

The band's cover of "Careless Whisper" was reportedly borne out of a joke response to Wind-up's request that the band record a Valentine's Day song for iTunes. "None of us are big fans of Valentine's Day," Morgan elaborated, "so we decided to take the piss out of it, and we went with a love song... It's such an over-the-top dramatic song that we had to cover it. It's something we just did as a joke, and we did it for fun, and it became a single."

A song titled "No Shelter" was also recorded during the sessions, but was cut as the band felt the song was out of place compared to the rest of the material. It was eventually included on disc two of the first soundtrack for the television series NCIS and on the band's 2013 greatest hits album.

Commercial performance
The album debuted at number nine on the Billboard 200 chart in the US with 56,900 copies moved in its first week, and ended up being certified platinum in 2020 for selling an equivalent of 1 million units. It is also the band's only album to receive Gold certification in their home country of South Africa (certified by the RISA in May 2008).

Track listing

"Quirk" is a demo version of "Fake It" and was apparently recorded in Morgan's bedroom.
Later versions of the album, pressed after the release of "Careless Whisper", were released with tracks 13 and 14 added on.

Credits
Seether
Shaun Morgan – lead vocals, guitar
Dale Stewart – bass, backing vocals
John Humphrey – drums
Troy McLawhorn – guitar (tracks 13, 14)

Additional musicians
Howard Benson – keyboards, programming
Space – guitar (track 12)

Technical credits
Howard Benson – producer
Ross Petersen – co-producer
Chris Lord-Alge — mixing
Mike Plotnikoff – engineer
Hatsukazu "Hatch" Inagaki – engineer
Paul DeCarli – digital editing
Hatsukazu Inagaki – additional engineering
Ted Jensen – mastering
Jon Nicholson – drum technician
Marc VanGool – guitar technician
Scott D. – guitar technician
Stu Sobol – management
Nicki Loranger – management
David Ho – illustrations
Gail Marowitz – art direction
Ed Sherman - package design
Gregg Wattenberg - A&R, production supervision

Charts

Weekly charts

Year-end charts

Certifications

References

2007 albums
Seether albums
Albums produced by Howard Benson
Wind-up Records albums